MDNA may refer to:

 Mitochondrial DNA (mDNA or mtDNA), the DNA located in organelles called mitochondria
 MDNA (album), a 2012 album by Madonna
 The MDNA Tour, the 2012 concert tour by Madonna to promote the album
 MDNA World Tour (album), the live album/BD of the tour

See also
 MDMA
 mRNA